STEM or science, technology, engineering, and mathematics is a group of academic disciplines.

STEM may also refer to:
 STEM.org, an educational company
 Scanning transmission electron microscopy, a type of microscopy
 Spatiotemporal Epidemiological Modeler, software developed by IBM

See also 
 Stem (disambiguation)
 STEMM (disambiguation)